Croatian Syrmian Initiative (HSI) was a political party in Serbia representing the Croat ethnic minority in Srem, Vojvodina.

History 
It was founded on February 5, 2008. Its most recent president was Ante Španović. The party's seat was in Sremska Mitrovica.

Unlike other Croat parties from Vojvodina, HSI has had good relations with the Democratic Alliance of Croats in Vojvodina. In 2009 HSI negotiated with DSHV. It was planned that HSI and DSHV unite on June 5, 2009 on the meeting in Sremska Mitrovica.

In the local elections in Serbia in 2008, Croatian Syrmian Initiative had one member on the Democratic Party's ballot, winning one mandate in Sremska Mitrovica.

External links

 Radio Subotica Završni pregovori oko ujedinjenja DSHV-a s Hrvatskom srijemskom inicijativom, 21. travnja 2009.
 Zvanična prezentacija Grada Sremska Mitrovica Grb

Croats of Vojvodina
Political parties established in 2008
Croat political parties in Serbia
Politics of Vojvodina